Lokotunjailurus is an extinct genus of saber-toothed cats (Machairodontinae) which existed in Kenya and Chad during the Miocene epoch.

Its dewclaws were particularly large in proportion to its body and were bigger than those of a much larger lion, indicating it relied on them quite heavily for grappling with prey. In comparison, its claws on the second to fourth digits were smaller than those of leopards.

The type species L. emageritus was documented by Lars Werdelin based on fossils found at the Lothagam site in Kenya.  He described it as a large felid with an extremely long claw on one digit.  He named the genus from the Turkana word for "cat" and the species from the word for "claw".  Werdelin considered L. emageritus to be similar to Homotherium in dentition and to represent a basal member of Homotherini.

A second species L. fanonei was described from fossils found in the Toros Menalla Formation in the Djurab Desert of Chad.  The deposits date to the Late Miocene (7 mya).

Paleoecology 
 
In the Djurab desert in northern Chad in central Africa,  Lokotunjailurus fanonei seems to have lived alongside fellow machairodonts Amphimachirodus kabir, Tchadailurus and early representatives of the genus Megantereon. In addition to these other cats, animals such as crocodiles, primitive three-toed horses, fish, monkeys, hippos, aardvarks, turtles, rodents, giraffes, snakes, antelopes, pigs, mongooses, foxes, hyenas, otters, honey badgers, the elephantid Stegotetrabelodon and the hominid Sahelanthropus tchadensis providing ample food for these cats, indicating that there was enough biodiversity that four sabertooths could coexist.

References

Miocene felids
Miocene mammals of Africa
Homotherini
Prehistoric carnivoran genera
Fossil taxa described in 2003